Kadarkút is a town in Somogy county, Hungary.

History
According to László Szita the settlement was completely Hungarian in the 18th century.

Twin towns — sister cities
Kadarkút is twinned with:

  Veliko Trojstvo, Croatia (2006)
  Voitsberg, Austria (2008)

References

External links 
 Official site of the town of Kadarkút
 Cultural Centre and Library (id. Kapoli Antal Művelődési Ház és Könyvtár)
 Kindergarten (Napköziotthonos Óvoda Kadarkút)
 Street map 

Populated places in Somogy County